Azalanstat (INN, codenamed RS-21607) is an anti-obesity drug acting as a lanosterol 14α-demethylase inhibitor.

References 

Antiobesity drugs
Chloroarenes
Dioxolanes
Hypolipidemic agents
Imidazoles
Lanosterol 14α-demethylase inhibitors
Thioethers